Below is an alphabetical list, by city, of music conservatories in Italy. Where a Wikipedia article does not yet exist, an external link is provided.

A-L
Adria – Conservatorio di Musica "Antonio Buzzolla"  
Alessandria –  Conservatorio di Musica "Antonio Vivaldi"
Avellino – Conservatorio di Musica "Domenico Cimarosa" 
Bari –  Conservatorio di Musica "Niccolò Piccinni"
Benevento – Conservatorio Statale di Musica "Nicola Sala" 
 Bologna – Conservatorio di Musica "Giovan Battista Martini"
 Bolzano – Conservatorio di Musica "Claudio Monteverdi"
Brescia – Conservatorio di Musica "Luca Marenzio"
Cagliari – Conservatorio Statale di Musica "Giovanni Pierluigi da Palestrina"
Campobasso – Conservatorio di Musica "Lorenzo Perosi"
Castelfranco Veneto – Conservatorio Statale di Musica "Agostino Steffani"
Cesena – Conservatorio Statale di Musica "Bruno Maderna"
Como – Conservatorio di Musica "Giuseppe Verdi"  
Cosenza – Conservatorio di Musica "Stanislao Giacomantonio"
Cuneo – Conservatorio "Giorgio Federico Ghedini"
Darfo – Conservatorio di Musica "Luca Marenzio"
Fermo – Conservatorio Statale di Musica "Giovanni Battista Pergolesi"
Ferrara – Conservatorio Statale di Musica "Girolamo Frescobaldi"
Florence – Conservatorio Luigi Cherubini
 Foggia – Conservatorio di Musica "Umberto Giordano"
Frosinone – Conservatorio "Licinio Refice"
Genoa – Conservatorio "Niccolò Paganini" 
L'Aquila – Conservatorio "Alfredo Casella"
La Spezia – Conservatorio "Giacomo Puccini"
 Latina – Conservatorio "Ottorino Respighi"
Lecce – Conservatorio "Tito Schipa"

M–Z
Mantua – Conservatorio di Musica "Lucio Campiani"
Matera – Conservatorio Statale di Musica "Egidio Romualdo Duni"
Messina – Conservatorio Statale di Musica "Arcangelo Corelli" 
Milan – Conservatorio di Musica "Giuseppe Verdi"
Monopoli – Conservatorio "Nino Rota"
Naples – Conservatorio di Musica San Pietro a Majella
Novara – Conservatorio "Guido Cantelli"
Padua – Conservatorio Statale di Musica "Cesare Pollini"
Palermo – Conservatorio di Musica "Vincenzo Bellini"
Parma – Conservatorio di Musica "Arrigo Boito"
Perugia – Conservatorio di Musica "Francesco Morlacchi"
Pesaro – Conservatorio Statale di Musica "Gioachino Rossini"
Pescara – Conservatorio "Luisa D'Annunzio"
Piacenza – Conservatorio "Giuseppe Nicolini"
Potenza – Conservatorio "Carlo Gesualdo"
Reggio Calabria – Conservatorio "Francesco Cilea"
Rome – Accademia Nazionale di Santa Cecilia
Rovigo – Conservatorio "Francesco Venezze"
Salerno – Conservatorio "Giuseppe Martucci"
Sassari – Conservatorio "Luigi Canepa"
Trapani – Conservatorio "Antonio Scontrino"
Trento – Conservatorio di Musica "Francesco Antonio Bonporti"
Trieste – Conservatorio di Musica "Giuseppe Tartini"
Turin – Conservatorio Statale di Musica "Giuseppe Verdi"
Udine – Conservatorio "Jacopo Tomadini"
Venice – Conservatorio di Musica "Benedetto Marcello"
Verona – Conservatorio "Evaristo Felice Dall'Abaco"
Vibo Valentia – Conservatorio "Fausto Torrefranca"
Vicenza – Conservatory of Vicenza Conservatorio di Musica "Arrigo Pedrollo"

Other music schools
Additionally, these are "higher music schools", termed pareggiate in Italian, meaning "equal". That is, they issue diplomas which carry the same weight as a conservatory diploma:

 Aosta
 Catania
Livorno 
Lucca
Pavia
Reggio Emilia
 Ribera
 Rimini
Siena
 Taranto
 Teramo

Music Conservatories
Music Conservatories

it:Conservatorio#Conservatori e istruzioni musicale in Italia